Gnorismoneura cylindrata is a moth of the family Tortricidae. It is found in China.

The wingspan is 12-13.5 mm for males and 15–18 mm for females. The ground color of the forewings is yellowish brown with dark brown patterns. The hindwings are dark grey.

Etymology
The specific name is derived from the Latin word cylindratus (meaning column shaped) and refers to the shape of the uncus.

References

Moths described in 2004
Archipini